Brian Caldwell Pohanka (March 20, 1955 – June 15, 2005) was an American Civil War author, historian, and preservationist.

Early life
Pohanka graduated from Dickinson College in 1977.

Career
Pohanka consulted for Civil War related films, such as Glory and Cold Mountain. He also made a brief and uncredited appearance as Union general Alexander S. Webb in the 1993 film of the battle of Gettysburg.

Pohanka advised on popular television documentaries, such as Civil War Journal on The History Channel and the Ken Burns documentary The Civil War. In addition, he was a reenactor and living historian, serving for over a decade as Captain of Company A of the 5th New York Volunteer Infantry, also known as "Duryée's Zouaves." He also attended annual reenactments at Gettysburg and the Little Bighorn.

Pohanka was named Battlefield Preservationist of the Year in 2004 by the Civil War Preservation Trust and the Central Virginia Battlefields Trust.

Death

Pohanka died of cancer in 2005, and was buried at Columbia Gardens Cemetery in Arlington, Virginia. He is survived by his wife, Cricket; father, brother and sister, among others.

Legacy
In 2006, Dickinson College created a Faculty Chair in American Civil War History position in his honor, which has been held by history professor and noted Abraham Lincoln scholar Matthew Pinsker.

Published works
 Where Custer Fell: Photographs of the Little Bighorn Battlefield Then and Now. Author, with James S. Brust and Sandy Barnard. University of Oklahoma Press, 2007.
 A Summer on the Plains with Custer's 7th Cavalry: The 1870 Diary of Annie Gibson Roberts. Schroeder Publications, 2004.
 The Soldier's View: The Civil War Art of Keith Rocco. Contributor. Military History Press, 2004.
 Civil War Journal: The Leaders. Editor, with William C. Davis and Don Troiani. Gramercy, 2003.
 Billy Heath: The Man Who Survived Custer's Last Stand. Author, with Vincent J. Genovese. Prometheus Books, 2003.
 A Duryee Zouave. Author, with Thomas P. Southwick and Patrick A. Schroeder. Schroeder Publications, 2002.
 An Illustrated History of the Civil War. Author, with William J. Miller. Time-Life Books, 2000.
 Campaigns of the 146th Regiment New York State Volunteers. Introduction. North Country Books, 2000.
 Don Troiani's Civil War. Author, with Don Troiani. Stackpole, 1999.
 Nor Shall Your Glory Be Forgot: An Essay in Photographs. Introduction. St Martins Press, 1999.
 Civil War Journal: The Legacies. Editor, with William C. Davis and Don Troiani. Rutledge Hill Press, 1999.
 Civil War Journal: The Battles. Editor, with William C. Davis and Don Troiani. Rutledge Hill Press, 1998.
 Portraits of the Civil War. Foreword. Barnes & Noble, 1998.
 Schroeder, Patrick A. We Came to Fight: The History of the 5th New York Veteran Volunteer Infantry Duryee's. Introduction.  North Country Books, 1998.
 Editor, "With the Fire Zouaves at First Bull Run: The Narrative of Private Arthur O. Alcock, 11th New York Volunteer Infantry." Regiments: A Journal of the American Civil War (Vol. 5, No. 4, 1997). (Map by Mark A. Moore)
 The Reno Court of Inquiry: Abstract of the Official Record of Proceedings. Introduction, with William A. Graham. Stackpole, 1995.
 Mapping the Civil War: Featuring Rare Maps from the Library of Congress. Author, with Christopher Nelson and the Library of Congress Geography and Map Division. Fulcrum Publishing, 1992.
 Myles Keogh: An Irish Dragoon in the 7th Cavalry. Editor, with John P. Langellier and  Kurt Hamilton Cox. Upton & Sons, 1991.
 Nelson A. Miles: A Documentary Biography of His Military Career, 1861–1903. Editor. Arthur H. Clark, 1986.
 Time-Life Books. Civil War Series (27 Volumes). Researcher, writer, and adviser.

Notes

External links

Washington Post Obituary from 17 June 2005

1955 births
2005 deaths
Dickinson College alumni
American military historians
Historians of the American Civil War
Deaths from cancer in Virginia
Writers from Washington, D.C.
20th-century American historians
21st-century American historians
21st-century American male writers
20th-century American male writers
American male non-fiction writers